Seven Souls is a 1989 album by the American music group Material. A collaboration with author William S. Burroughs, the album features his narration of passages from his novel The Western Lands (1987) set to musical accompaniment.

The album was re-released in 1997 with bonus tracks, three re-mixes that were added to the beginning of the album. In 1998, a new title, The Road to the Western Lands, was issued, composed of new mixes of the tracks.

"Equation" / "Ineffect" was released as a single in 1989 (Virgin America, PR 3380).

Track listing
"Ineffect" (Bill Laswell, Nicky Skopelitis, William S. Burroughs, Simon Shaheen) – 7:34
"Seven Souls" (Laswell, Burroughs) – 5:42
"Soul Killer" (Laswell, Burroughs) – 4:32
"The Western Lands" (Laswell, Skopelitis, Burroughs) – 6:54
"Deliver" (Laswell, Skopelitis, Foday Musa Suso) – 5:48
"Equation" (Laswell, Skopelitis, Rammellzee) – 5:06
"The End of Words" (Laswell, Burroughs) – 5:06

Seven Souls (Remix)
"The Western Lands" [a Dangerous Road Mix] (Laswell, Burroughs) – 8:31
"Seven Souls" [Tim Simenon Mix] (Tim Simenon, Burroughs) – 7:06
"Soul Killer" [Remote Control Mix by Terre Thaemlitz] (Terre Thaemlitz, Burroughs) – 8:15
The rest of the album as per the original release

The Road to the Western Lands
Bill Laswell – "The Seven Souls" (Burroughs, Laswell) – 5:47
Talvin Singh – "The Western Lands" (Burroughs, Talvin Singh) 6:36
DJ Soul Slinger – "The Western Lands" (Burroughs, DJ Soul Slinger) 5:09
Spring Heel Jack – "The Road to the Western Lands" (Burroughs, John Coxon, Ashley Wales) 6:17
The Audio Janitor (DJ Olive) – "Joan's Haunted Hints at the Gate to the Western Lands" (Burroughs, DJ Olive) 6:37
Bill Laswell – "Seven Souls" [The Secret Name] (Burroughs, Laswell) 10:37
Material – "The Western Lands" [A Dangerous Road Mix] (Burroughs, Laswell) – 8:31

Personnel
Material
Bill Laswell – 4, 6 and 8-string basses, acoustic guitar, tapes, percussion

Additional personnel
William S. Burroughs – voice
Rammellzee – voice ("Equation")
Foday Musa Suso – voice ("Deliver")
Fahiem Dandan – voice  ("Ineffect")
Nicky Skopelitis – 6 and 12 string guitars, baglama, coral sitar, saz, Fairlight CMI
Simon Shaheen – violin
L. Shankar – violin
Jeff Bova – electronic keyboards
Sly Dunbar – drums, Fairlight
Aïyb Dieng – percussion

"The Western Lands" [a Dangerous Road Mix]
Jah Wobble – bass
Bill Laswell – bass samples
Nicky Skopelitis – guitar
Tetsu Inoue – electronics
DJ Spooky – noise

"The Seven Souls" [The Secret Name]
Alicia Renee aka Blue Eyes: vocals
Nicky Skopelitis: guitar
Bill Laswell: bass, keyboards, turntable

Production
Recorded at Platinum Island Studio and BC Studio, New York.
Produced by Bill Laswell / Material.

Release history
Seven Souls – 1989 – Virgin, CDV 2596 (CD)
Seven Souls (Remix) – 1997 – Triloka Records, 314 534 905-2 (CD)
The Road to the Western Lands – 1998 – Triloka / Mercury, 314 558 021-2 (2x 12" / CD)

In popular culture
The track "Seven Souls" is featured in the opening scene and in the closing credits of The Sopranos Season 6 episode, "Members Only".

References

External links 
 
 Seven Souls at Bandcamp

1989 albums
Material (band) albums
Albums produced by Bill Laswell
Virgin Records albums
William S. Burroughs